SS Lake Elsmere was an Emergency Fleet Corporation (EFC) Design 1074 cargo ship built for the United States Shipping Board (USSB) during the massive shipbuilding effort of World War I.

The USSB operated the ship until sold in 1923 to the Southern Steamship Company for operation between Philadelphia and Houston as City of Philadelphia. In June 1942 the ship was delivered to the War Shipping Administration (WSA) for wartime operation first allocated to the U.S. Army with the WSA operator being Atlantic Gulf and West Indies Lines (AGWILINES), the parent company of Southern Steamship. On 27 May 1943 WSA obtained the vessel under bareboat charter with Army operating the ship under sub-bareboat charter. As USAT City of Philadelphia the ship arrived in Australia to remain the rest of the war in the U.S. Army Services of Supply permanent local fleet with the fleet designation X-104. WSA delivered the ship to the owners at Shanghai in December 1945 where the ship was sold to the China Merchants Steam Navigation Company and renamed Hai Cheh. Later sold to the Republic of China the ship was named Ho Ping Pa Hao 1950 to 1960 and Hoping No. 8 1960 until 1967 when the ship dropped out of registers.

Construction 
Lake Elsmere, hull 513, was one of eight Design 1074 ships built by Great Lakes Engineering Works at its Ashtabula, Ohio yard, launched 3 November 1919 with completion later that month. A total of fifty-two Design 1074, "Great Lakes Engineering type," were built in among a larger group of ships built for the USSB on the Great Lakes known as the "Laker" type.

The ship disappeared from registry in 1967.

U.S. Operation 
The USSB operated Lake Elsmere from delivery in November 1919 until sold in an offer accepted 10 April 1923 of the Southern Steamship Company, a wholly owned subsidiary of Atlantic Gulf and West Indies Lines (AGWILINES), for $75,000. The ship was renamed City of Philadelphia, registered at Philadelphia, operating in freight service between Philadelphia and Houston, Texas.

On 6 June 1942 the ship was delivered to the War Shipping Administration (WSA) at New Orleans for wartime operation under an Army charter agreement with AGWILINES as the WSA operating agent. That changed to a sub-bareboat charter by the Army from WSA on 27 May 1943 in New York with the ship operating as USAT City of Philadelphia.

City of Philadelphia was among the vessels meeting transportation requirements in the South West Pacific Area (SWPA). The vessels were to be capable of troop transport without significant loss of cargo capacity. Such vessels were typically in coastwise trade in the United States and the size limitation of passage from the Great Lakes to the coasts meant that many were built on the Great Lakes with them often being termed "Lakers" or "Lake type vessels". Such vessels were allocated to meet the SWPA requirement with City of Philadelphia, arriving 12 November 1943 and given the SWPA fleet identification X-104, being one of 29 sent by 11 February 1844. The ship was classed among the  vessels and among the ten altered to transport refrigerated cargo.

After the war WSA redelivered City of Philadelphia to the owners at Shanghai on 29 December 1945 who, with United States Maritime Commission approval sold the ship for $158,973.89 to China on 4 January 1946.

China service 
Renamed Hai Cheh the ship operated for China Merchants Steam Navigation Company until transferred to the Republic of China in 1949. From 1950 the ship was operated by China People's Steam Navigation Co., Shanghai as Ho Ping Pa Hao 1950—1960 and Hoping No. 8 1960—1967 when the ship dropped out of registers in 1969.

Footnotes

References

External links 
 USAT City of Philadelphia, NavSource Online: Army Ship Photo Archive

1919 ships
Ships built in Ashtabula, Ohio
Design 1074 ships
Merchant ships of the United States
Merchant ships of China